San Francisco City Hall is the seat of government for the City and County of San Francisco, California. Re-opened in 1915 in its open space area in the city's Civic Center, it is a Beaux-Arts monument to the City Beautiful movement that epitomized the high-minded American Renaissance of the 1880s to 1917. The present building replaced an earlier City Hall that was destroyed during the 1906 earthquake, which was two blocks from the present one.

The principal architect was Arthur Brown, Jr., of Bakewell & Brown, whose attention to the finishing details extended to the doorknobs and the typeface to be used in signage. Brown also designed the San Francisco War Memorial Opera House, Veterans Building, Temple Emanuel, Coit Tower and the Federal office building at 50 United Nations Plaza.



Architecture

The building as a whole contains 7,900 tons (7,035 metric tons) of structural steel from the American Bridge Company of Ambridge, Pennsylvania near Pittsburgh. It is faced with Madera County granite on the exterior, and Indiana sandstone within, together with finish marbles from Alabama, Colorado, Vermont, and Italy. Much of the statuary is by Henri Crenier.

The upper levels of the Rotunda are public and handicapped accessible. Opposite the grand staircase, on the second floor, is the office of the Mayor. Bronze busts of former Mayor George Moscone and his successor, Dianne Feinstein, stand nearby as tacit reminders of the Moscone assassination, which took place just a few yards from that spot in the smaller rotunda of the mayor's office entrance. A bust of former county supervisor Harvey Milk, who was assassinated in the building was unveiled on May 22, 2008. While hard to discern these days, the inscription that dominates the grand Rotunda and the entrance to the mayor's small rotunda, right below Father Time, reads:

SAN • FRANCISCO
O • GLORIOVS • CITY • OF • OVR
HEARTS • THAT • HAST • BEEN
TRIED • AND • NOT • FOVND
WANTING • GO • THOV • WITH
LIKE • SPIRIT • TO • MAKE
THE • FVTVRE • THINE
1912 JAMES ROLPH JR. MAYOR 1931

The words were written by the previous Mayor Edward Robeson Taylor, and dedicated by Mayor James Rolph.

While plaques at the Mall entrance memorialize President George Washington's farewell address and President Abraham Lincoln's Gettysburg Address, the primary themes of the statuary are to the past mayors, with the dates of their terms in office. The medallions in the vaults of the Rotunda are of Equality, Liberty, Strength, Learning and, as memorialized in the South Light Court display, Progress.

History

The current City Hall building is a replacement for the original building, which was designed by Augustus Laver and Thomas Stent and completed in 1899 after 27 years of planning and construction. The original city hall was a much larger building which also contained a smaller extension which contained the city's Hall of Records. It was bounded by Larkin Street, McAllister Street, and City Hall Avenue (a street, now built over, which ran from the corner of Grove and Larkin to the corner of McAllister and Leavenworth), largely where the current public library and U.N. Plaza stand today. Noted city planner and architect Daniel Burnham published a plan in 1905 to redesign the city, including a new Civic Center complex around City Hall, but the plans were shelved in the wake of the 1906 San Francisco earthquake, which destroyed the 1899 City Hall.

Reconstruction plans following the earthquake for the Civic Center complex called for a neo-classical design as part of the city beautiful movement, as well as a desire to rebuild the city in time for the 1915 Panama–Pacific International Exposition. A bond was authorized for $8.8 million on March 28, 1912, of which the new City Hall was budgeted for $3.5 million to $4 million. After Arthur Brown Junior's design was selected from the competition, construction started in 1913 and was completed by 1915, in time for the Exposition.

Ground was broken for the new City Hall at Van Ness and Fulton on April 5, 1913, and the cornerstone was laid on October 25 of that year. Mayor Rolph moved into City Hall on December 28, 1915, the final stone was laid on March 31, 1916, and scaffolding was finally removed on July 28, officially marking the end of construction.

The main rotunda served as the site where many prominent politicians and public servants laid in state. General Fredrick Funston, hero of the Spanish–American War, Philippine–American War, and the 1906 earthquake laid there in 1917. President Warren G. Harding laid here in 1923. Former mayor and governor James Rolph laid in state in City Hall following his death in 1934.

Joe DiMaggio and Marilyn Monroe were married at City Hall in January 1954.

In May 1960, the main Rotunda was a site of a student protest against the House Un-American Activities Committee and a countering police action whereby students from UC Berkeley, Stanford, and other local colleges were fire hosed down the steps beneath the rotunda.  This event was memorialized by students during the Free Speech Movement at UC Berkeley four years later.

Mayor George Moscone and Supervisor Harvey Milk were assassinated at City Hall in 1978, by former Supervisor Dan White.

The Loma Prieta earthquake of 1989 damaged the structure, and twisted the dome four inches (102 mm) on its base. Afterward, under the leadership of the San Francisco Bureau of Architecture in collaboration with Carey & Co. preservation architects, and Forell/Elsesser Engineers, work was completed to render the building earthquake resistant through a base isolation system, which would likely prevent total collapse of the building.  City Hall reopened after its seismic upgrade in January 1999, and was the world's largest base-isolated structure at that time.

Prior to the retrofitting, the San Francisco County Superior Court’s civil courtrooms were located in City Hall, but have been located across the street at the 400 McAllister courthouse since it opened in 1997.

The original grand plaza has undergone several extensive renovations, with radical changes in its appearance and utility. Prior to the 1960s there were extensive brick plazas, few trees, and a few large, simple, raised, and circular ponds with central fountains, all in a style that discouraged loitering. The plaza was then extensively excavated for underground parking. At this time a central rectangular pond, with an extensive array of water vents (strangely, all in several strict rows and all pointing east, with identical arcs of water, and completely without sculptural embellishment), was added, with extensive groves of trees (again, in 60s modernist style, planted with absolute military precision on rectangular grids). In the 1990s, with the rise of the problem of homelessness, the plaza was once again remodeled to make it somewhat less habitable—although the most significant change, the replacement of the pond and pumps with a lawn, could be reasonably justified on the basis of energy and water conservation.

The building features color changeable LED lighting at the outside of the Rotunda, and between the exterior columns. The colors change to coincide with different events happening in the city and elsewhere.

During the COVID-19 pandemic, City Hall was closed from March 2020 until reopening on June 7, 2021.

In popular culture

 Dirty Harry (1971) filmed several scenes at City Hall, including inside the Mayor's office.
 The Towering Inferno (1974)
 Invasion of the Body Snatchers (1978)
 Foul Play (1978)
 A View to a Kill (1985)
 The Grand Staircase is featured in the Raiders of the Lost Ark (1981) as a stand-in for an unnamed government building in Washington, D.C.
 A View to a Kill (1985)
 Ten-thousand-watt spotlights triggered the fire sprinkler system during the filming of Bicentennial Man (1999), resulting in water damage. The crew previously shot in the Supervisors' chambers.
 Milk (2008)

See also

 List of San Francisco Designated Landmarks
 List of tallest buildings in San Francisco
 List of tallest domes

References
Informational notes

Citations

External links

 San Francisco City Hall – official site
 Virtual tour on the official site
 Virtual Tour of City Hall and Dome An unofficial guide to items of historic, artistic and architectural interest.
 360 degree panoramic photographs of San Francisco's City Hall, from Don Bain's 360° Panoramas
 San Francisco government City hall restoration project (late 1990s)
 Historic American Buildings Survey (Library of Congress): City Hall, Civic Center, San Francisco, San Francisco County, CA
 Images of City Hall and Civic Center, 1912-1918 and The New City Hall, 1915, The Bancroft Library

Arthur Brown Jr. buildings
Beaux-Arts architecture in California
Buildings and structures burned in the 1906 San Francisco earthquake
City halls in California
.City Hall
Government buildings completed in 1915
Government buildings with domes
Rebuilt buildings and structures in the United States
San Francisco City Hall
City Hall
Terminating vistas in the United States
City Hall
Assassination sites